Roberto García Parrondo (born 12 January 1980) is a retired Spanish handball player and current coach of MT Melsungen.

As part of the Spanish team, he played in the 2005 Mediterranean Games and the 2007 World Championship in Germany. García is 1.86 m tall and weighs 86 kg.

Honours

Player

Club
BM Valladolid
 Copa ASOBAL (1): 2002

CB Ademar León
 EHF Cup Winner's Cup (1): 2005

BM Ciudad Real
 Liga ASOBAL (3): 2008, 2009, 2010
 Copa del Rey (2): 2008, 2011
 Copa ASOBAL (2): 2007, 2010
 Supercopa de España (2): 2008, 2011
 EHF Champions League (2): 2008, 2009
 EHF Men's Champions Trophy (1): 2008

BM Atlético de Madrid
 Supercopa de España (1): 2012
 Copa del Rey (2): 2012, 2013
 IHF Super Globe (1): 2012

Pick Szeged
 EHF Cup (1): 2014

International
Spain
 Mediterranean Games (1): 2005

Manager

Club
RK Vardar
 EHF Champions League: 2018–19
 SEHA League: 2018–19
 Macedonian Handball Super League: 2018–19

International
Egypt
 African Championship: 2020, 2022

References

External links
 BM Atlético profile

1980 births
Living people
Spanish male handball players
Liga ASOBAL players
Sportspeople from Madrid
CB Ademar León players
BM Valladolid players
Spanish expatriate sportspeople in North Macedonia
Competitors at the 2005 Mediterranean Games
Mediterranean Games gold medalists for Spain
Mediterranean Games medalists in handball
Handball coaches of international teams
Spanish handball coaches
Handball players from the Community of Madrid